The 1959–60 European Cup was the premier European women's basketball championship's second edition. Ten teams entered the competition, with defending champion Slavia Sofia receiving a bye for the semifinals.

Soviet champion Daugava Riga won the championship in its debut appearance, defeating Slavia Sofia in the final. It was the first of Daugava's record 18 titles.

Qualification round

Quarter-finals

Semifinals

Final

References

Champions Cup
European
European
EuroLeague Women seasons